Perilytoceras is a genus of ammonoid cephalopods belonging to the family Lytoceratidae.

These fast-moving nektonic carnivores lived in the Toarcian age (from 182.7 to 174.1 million years ago).

References

External links
 Paleotheque

Jurassic ammonites
Ammonitida genera
Lytoceratidae